Feltia nigrita is a moth of the family Noctuidae first described by Ludwig Carl Friedrich Graeser in 1892. It is found in Siberia, central Yakutia, the Amur and Primorye regions, as well as British Columbia, Alberta, Saskatchewan, Yukon and Manitoba.

External links

"Noctuinae (Noctuidae) collection of Siberian Zoological Museum".
Fauna Europaea

Noctuinae
Moths of North America
Moths of Asia